Frank is a  census-designated place (CDP) in Pocahontas County, West Virginia, United States.  The population was 90 at the 2010 census. It was named to honor Frank Hoffman in 1926. Hoffman was the proprietor of a local tannery.

The unemployment rate in Frank is 6.2% (U.S. avg. is 3.9%). Compared to the rest of the country, Frank's cost of living is 28.8% lower than the U.S. average.

References

Census-designated places in Pocahontas County, West Virginia
Census-designated places in West Virginia